Ivan Toshev (born 13 August 1992) is a Bulgarian footballer who plays as a midfielder for Minyor Radnevo.

References

External links
 

1992 births
Living people
Bulgarian footballers
First Professional Football League (Bulgaria) players
PFC Vidima-Rakovski Sevlievo players
FC Botev Galabovo players
FC Montana players
FC Botev Vratsa players
FC Minyor Radnevo players
Association football midfielders